The 2014–15 Latvian Basketball League is the 24th season of the top basketball league of Latvia. The regular season began on October 1, 2014, and ended on April 11, 2015. The playoffs began on April 15, 2015, and ended on May 28, 2015.

Participants 

VEF Rīga
BK Ventspils
Liepāja/Triobet
BK Valmiera
BK Jelgava
Jūrmala/Fēnikss
BK Jēkabpils
Latvijas Universitāte
Barons/LDz
BK Saldus

Regular season

Playoffs

Awards

All-Star Game

See also
2014–15 VTB United League
2014–15 Baltic Basketball League

References

External links
Official website

Latvijas Basketbola līga
Latvian